Stade Al-Taka Kassala is a multi-use stadium in Kassala, Sudan.  It is currently used mostly for football matches and is the home stadium of Taka Kassala.  The stadium has a capacity of 3,000 people. It is the second biggest stadium in Kassala.

Al-Taka Kassala